General Sir Adrian John Bradshaw,  (born 1958) is a former British Army officer who served as Deputy Supreme Allied Commander Europe. He also served as Director Special Forces from 2006 to 2009 and Commander Land Forces in 2013.

Early life
Bradshaw was educated at Bloxham School, received a BSc degree from the University of Reading in 1979, and obtained an MSc degree in Defence Studies in 1991 as well an MA degree in International Relations in 2005, both from King's College London.

Military career
Bradshaw was commissioned into the 14th/20th King's Hussars in 1980. In 1994 he became Commanding Officer of the King's Royal Hussars commanding the KRH Battlegroup in Bosnia. On promotion to Brigadier he became Senior Advisor to the Combined Forces Air Component Command preparing for the invasion of Iraq. He was Deputy Commander of Task Force West during the Anglo-American invasion of Iraq in March 2003 and took charge of 7th Armoured Brigade during initial stabilisation operations in April 2003. By 2006 he was Director Special Forces.

In March 2009 Bradshaw was appointed General Officer Commanding 1st (UK) Armoured Division which undertook a major training exercise in the Czech Republic in May 2009. He became Deputy Commander International Security Assistance Force in Afghanistan and United Kingdom National Contingent Commander in Afghanistan in the rank of lieutenant general in November 2011. He is Vice-Chairman of the Combined Services Polo Association.

Bradshaw assumed the role of Commander Land Forces in succession to General Sir Nick Parker in January 2013. He was succeeded by Lieutenant General Nick Carter as Commander Land Forces in November 2013.

Bradshaw was promoted to general and appointed Deputy Supreme Allied Commander Europe on 28 March 2014. As of 2015, Bradshaw was paid a salary of between £170,000 and £174,999 by the department, making him one of the 328 most highly paid people in the British public sector at that time. He retired on 12 August 2017.

He held the honorary position of Regimental Colonel of the King's Royal Hussars from 2017 to 2022.

Bradshaw was appointed an Officer of the Order of the British Empire in 1998 and appointed an Officer of the Legion of Merit by the President of the United States in 2003. He was also appointed a Companion of the Order of the Bath in the 2009 New Year Honours and advanced to Knight Commander of the Order of the Bath in the 2013 Birthday Honours. In 2022 it was announced he had received the insignia of a Commander of the Order of the Crown from the King of Belgium.

Later career
On 7 June 2018, during the annual Founder's Day Parade at the Royal Hospital Chelsea, it was announced that Bradshaw would become the new Governor of the Hospital in September 2018, succeeding General Sir Redmond Watt.

Bradshaw joined the Blesma Board of Trustees and was elected Chairman in 2017.

Awards and decorations

National honours
:
 Knight Commander of the Most Honourable Order of the Bath (KCB) (2013)
 Companion of the Most Honourable Order of the Bath (CB) (2009)
 Officer of the Most Excellent Order of the British Empire (OBE) (1998)

Foreign honours
:
 Officer of the Legion of Merit (2003)
:
 Commander of the Order of the Crown (2022)

References

|-

|-

|-

|-

1958 births
Living people
14th/20th King's Hussars officers
20th-century British Army personnel
Alumni of King's College London
Alumni of the University of Reading
British Army generals
British Army personnel of the Iraq War
British Army personnel of the War in Afghanistan (2001–2021)
Foreign recipients of the Legion of Merit
King's Royal Hussars officers
Knights Commander of the Order of the Bath
NATO military personnel
Officers of the Order of the British Empire
People educated at Bloxham School
Special Air Service officers
Deputy Lieutenants of Greater London